Sonapur Ali Akbar High School is a public secondary school located in Noakhali, Bangladesh. The campus is located in Sonapur Union, Sonaimuri, Noakhali.

Educational institutions established in 1971
High schools in Bangladesh
Schools in Noakhali District
Sonaimuri Upazila